Andrew Robert Isaac Umeed (born 19 April 1996) is a Scottish first-class cricketer. He made his first-class debut in the 2015–17 ICC Intercontinental Cup against Afghanistan in June 2015. He made his List A debut for Warwickshire against the West Indies A team in a tri-series warm-up match on 17 June 2018. In July 2022, Umeed became the first graduate of the South Asian Cricket Academy to sign a multi-year contract with a county side, after signing with Somerset until the end of 2023.

References

External links
 
 

1996 births
Living people
Scottish cricketers
Cricketers from Glasgow
Warwickshire cricketers
Somerset cricketers